Road rally may refer to:

 Rallying
 Peanuts Road Rally (disambiguation)
 "Road Rally", a 2010 episode of season 3 of Mickey Mouse Clubhouse